Berry Ladies Football Club is a Ghanaian professional women's football club based in Accra in the Greater Accra Region of Ghana. The club features in the Ghana Women’s Premier League. The club was previously known as Halifax Ladies Football Club or as Halifax Soccer Academy Ladies until 2020.

History 
Berry Ladies (then Halifax Ladies Football Club or Halifax Soccer Academy Ladies) was based in Nungua in Greater Accra Region. In 2020, the club was taken over by a new management board led by Gifty Oware-Aboagye. The name of the club was then changed to Berry Ladies. The club was relocated from Nungua to Madina still within the Greater Accra Region.

Grounds 
The club plays their home matches at the Madina AstroTurf.

References

External links 

 Official Website
 Supreme Ladies FC on Twitter

Women's football clubs in Ghana